The Okean class, Russian designation Project 22100 Okean (ocean), is a class of oceanic patrol vessels being constructed by Zelenodolsk Shipyard for the Russian Coast Guard. The vessels of this class are intended for protection of Russia's exclusive economic zone (EEZ), providing support to combat and rescue missions, fire fighting or fisheries protection. Apart from this, the ships will be involved in ensuring actions of the FSB of Russia by fighting terrorism and piracy, goods smuggling, drug trafficking or illegal migration.

Design
The project 22100 has a displacement of 2700 tons and a maximum speed up to 21 knots. The ships of the class are armed with a single AK-176M 76 mm gun on the bow, and two 14.5 mm machine guns on the sides. The 76 mm gun can be used to engage surface and airborne targets, along with the ability to engage targets on land. These multi-function vessels can also operate in arctic and non-arctic freezing areas of the Russian Federation due to their strengthened hull, what gives them some ice breaking capabilities. For airborne operations, on the stern there is a helicopter hangar and a helipad for one Ka-27 helicopter.

The ships are equipped with the latest electronic systems, including the navigational-tactical complex "Matelot-22100" developed by the JSC Kronstadt Group. The main features of the "Matelot-22100" are: an integrated bridge system, a video information display subsystem, a subsystem for processing and broadcasting of navigation information, a flight control system for deck operations, a comprehensive control system for technical equipment and an information system for the ship's central command post. Furthermore, the ships are equipped with an electronic map system NEX-4PV, designed specifically for border guards. The ships's surveillance system is explosion resistant.

Ships
Italics indicate estimates

See also
List of ships of Russia by project number
Rubin-class patrol boat
Project 22160 patrol ship

References

External links
Project 22100 at RussianShips

Patrol vessels of Russia